is a Japanese Professional footballer who plays as a midfielder for Tampines Rovers.

Club career

Albirex Niigata Singapore 
Nakamura signed for Albirex Niigata Singapore for the 2019 Singapore Premier League season, joining the White Swans from Japanese third-tier side YSCC Yokohama. The Japanese playmaker scored seven during the season, including a 35-metre lob in a 3-3 draw in July against Home United, earning him a nomination for the Goal of the Year accolade. He was also nominated for the Young Player of the Year award.

Tampines Rovers 
After skippering Albirex Niigata Singapore to a 4th placed finish and nominated for the 2019 SPL Young Player of the Year and Goal of the Year awards, Nakamura was snapped up by Singaporean giants Tampines Rovers FC.

In January 2022, Kyoga was handed a new five-year deal by the Stags in an unprecedented move in Singaporean football, making it the longest contract extension in Singaporean league history. Kyoga had turned down offers from clubs in Japan, Indonesia and Thailand before reaffirming his commitment to the club.

International career
In October 2013, Nakamura was selected for Japan U-17 national team for 2013 U-17 World Cup. He played 3 matches.

Club statistics

Club

Notes

International statistics

U17 International caps

References

External links

Profile at JEF United Chiba
Profile at YSCC Yokohama

1996 births
Living people
Association football people from Chiba Prefecture
Japanese footballers
J2 League players
J3 League players
JEF United Chiba players
YSCC Yokohama players
FC Ryukyu players
Association football midfielders